The Bureau of Economic Analysis (BEA) of the United States Department of Commerce is a U.S. government agency that provides official macroeconomic and industry statistics, most notably reports about the gross domestic product (GDP) of the United States and its various units—states, cities/towns/townships/villages/counties, and metropolitan areas.  They also provide information about personal income, corporate profits, and government spending in their National Income and Product Accounts (NIPAs).

The BEA is one of the principal agencies of the U.S. Federal Statistical System. Its stated mission is to "promote a better understanding of the U.S. economy by providing the most timely, relevant, and accurate economic data in an objective and cost-effective manner".

BEA has about 500 employees and an annual budget of approximately $101 million.

National accounts 

BEA's national economic statistics (National Economic Accounts) provide a comprehensive view of U.S. production, consumption, investment, exports and imports, and income and saving. These statistics are best known by summary measures such as gross domestic product (GDP), corporate profits, personal income and spending, and personal saving.

The National Income and Product Accounts (NIPAs) provide information about personal income, corporate profits, government spending, fixed assets, and changes in the net worth of the U.S. Economy.

The accounts also include other approaches and methods of measuring income and spending, such as the gross domestic income (GDI) and gross national income (GNI).

Industry accounts 
The industry economic accounts, presented both in an input-output framework and as annual output by each industry, provide a detailed view of the interrelationships between U.S. producers and users and the contribution to production across industries. These accounts are used extensively by policymakers and businesses to understand industry interactions, productivity trends, and the changing structure of the U.S. economy.

There are quarterly and annual reports for "GDP by Industry Accounts", designed for analysis of a specific industry's contribution to overall economic growth and inflation.

Regional Economic Accounts 
The regional economic accounts provide information about the geographic distribution of U.S. economic activity and growth. The estimates of gross domestic product (GDP) by state and state and local area personal income (PI), and the accompanying detail, provide a consistent framework for analyzing and comparing individual state and local area economies.

Uses of the regional program estimates 
 The Federal government uses regional income and product estimates to distribute funds to states:
 BEA Regional Income and Product Account Estimates Used to Distribute $406.8 Billion in Federal Funds 
 FY2016 Federal Funds Distribution Using BEA Regional Income and Product Account Statistics
 Federal Uses of BEA Regional Statistics, FY2016
 Twenty-six states have set constitutional or statutory limits on state government revenues or spending that are tied to BEA state personal income or one of its components 
 The National Oceanic and Atmospheric Administration (NOAA) produces statistics for coastal areas, utilizing BEA regional statistics.
 Academic researchers use the estimates for applied economic research.
 Businesses, trade associations, and labor organizations use the estimates for market research.

Regional Program 
The regional program maintains a partnership with a group of users, its members including State agencies, universities, and Census Primary State Data Centers. Users disseminate regional data and give feedback on our estimates and the presentation of the estimates. Distribution in this way encourages State universities and State agencies to use data that are comparable for all States and counties and consistent with national totals, thus enhancing the uniformity of analytic approaches taken in economic development programs and improving the recipients' ability to assess local area economic developments and to service their local clientele.

International 
The international transactions accounts provide information on trade in goods and services (including the balance of payments and the balance of trade), investment income, and government and private financial flows. In addition, the accounts measure the value of U.S. international assets and liabilities and direct investment by multinational enterprises. BEA’s data on direct investment— the most detailed data set on the activities of multinational enterprises (MNEs) available—are used to assess the role these business enterprises play in the global economy.

History 
An earlier Office of Business Economics produced GNP statistics and was renamed to become the BEA in a reorganization of January 1, 1972. An earlier administrative history is available on the site of the U.S. National Archives.

See also

Title 15 of the Code of Federal Regulations
Bureau of the Census
Bureau of Labor Statistics
Consumer Leverage Ratio
Bureau of Economic Analysis regions
Survey of Current Business, the monthly publication of the BEA that includes their official statistics

References

External links

 
 Bureau of Economic Analysis in the Federal Register
Brief history of Bureau of Economic Analysis
BEA Data Application Programming Interface (API)
Measuring the Economy from the BEA has information about what GDP is, and brief summaries about the summaries created by the BEA.

Economic research institutes
National statistical services
United States Department of Commerce agencies
1972 establishments in Washington, D.C.
Federal Statistical System of the United States